Markus Schmidt (born October 12, 1977) is an Austrian former professional association football player who spent 14 years at SV Mattersburg as a midfielder.

References

1977 births
Living people
Austrian footballers
Association football midfielders
SV Mattersburg players
Austrian Football Bundesliga players